Dunloup Creek is a stream in the U.S. state of West Virginia.

Dunloup Creek most likely derives its name from a local family name.

See also
List of rivers of West Virginia

References

Rivers of Fayette County, West Virginia
Rivers of Raleigh County, West Virginia
Rivers of West Virginia